Yoda purpurata is a species of acorn worm discovered 2.5 km (about 1.5 miles) below the surface of the Atlantic ocean, and was the first of the genus Yoda found. It was the first known hermaphroditic member within the phylum. The other known hermaphroditic member of the phylum is Yoda demiankoopi discovered in 2021.

Even if both male and female sex organs are present, the different individuals are acting as either male or female, not both, which makes them sequential hermaphrodites, alternating between male and female over the course of their lives.

References

External links

Enteropneusta
Animals described in 2012
Star Wars